Victoire Pauline L'or Ngon Ntame (born ) is a Cameroonian volleyball player. She is a member of the Cameroon women's national volleyball team and played for INJS Yaoundé in 2014. 

She was part of the Cameroonian national team at the 2014 FIVB Volleyball Women's World Championship in Italy, and the 2016 Summer Olympics.

Clubs
  INJS Yaoundé (2014)

References

External links
http://italy2014.fivb.org/en/competition/teams/cmr-cameroon/players/victoire-pauline-l'or-ngon-ntame?id=41061
http://rio2016.fivb.com/en/volleyball/women/teams/cmr-cameroon/players/victoire-pauline-l'or-ngon-ntame?id=53659
http://www.gettyimages.com/pictures/victoire-pauline-l-or-ngon-ntame-13612092#cameroons-victoire-pauline-lor-ngon-ntame-celebrates-a-point-during-picture-id589483332
http://www.cavb.org/pagescom.php?option=pagedetail&id=353

1985 births
Living people
Cameroonian women's volleyball players
Place of birth missing (living people)
Olympic volleyball players of Cameroon
Volleyball players at the 2016 Summer Olympics
Middle blockers
21st-century Cameroonian women